Souleymane Aonge Barry Kader  (born 26 March 1986), known simply as Barry Kader, is an Ivorian former footballer who played as a midfielder.

References

1986 births
Living people
Ivorian footballers
Association football midfielders
Sogndal Fotball players
SK Vard Haugesund players
CS Turnu Severin players
Eliteserien players
Norwegian First Division players
Liga I players
Ivorian expatriate footballers
Expatriate footballers in Norway
Ivorian expatriate sportspeople in Norway
Expatriate footballers in Romania
Ivorian expatriate sportspeople in Romania
Footballers from Abidjan